Joseph Reed Abbey (March 21, 1925 – March 6, 2014) was an American football player.

References

1925 births
2014 deaths
Players of American football from Texas
American football wide receivers
Chicago Bears players
New York Bulldogs players
Sportspeople from Denton, Texas
Texas Longhorns football players